Birgit Treiber (born 26 February 1960) is a former swimmer from the German Democratic Republic. She won one gold and two silver medals in the 1976 Summer Olympics and a bronze medal in the 1980 Summer Olympics. It was later proven she was extensively involved in an illegal doping program that greatly improved her swimming abilities.

Career 
She began her international career in 1975, setting a new world record in the 200 m backstroke at the 1975 World Aquatics Championships, where she also won silver medal in the 100 m breaststroke.

At the 1976 Summer Olympics, she won a gold medal in the 4 × 100 m medley relay. She swam only in the preliminary round, where the East Germany team set a new Olympic record. In the 100 meters and 200 meters backstroke she finished second behind Ulrike Richter. In the same year she set world records in the 400 m individual medley and 200 m backstroke. Next year she won three gold medals at the European LC Championships 1977.

After winning three silver medals at the 1978 and a bronze medal at the 1980 Summer Olympics she ended her swimming career and became a dentist. It was later revealed that she was involved in the East Germany doping program.

References

External links

 

German female swimmers
Doping cases in swimming
German sportspeople in doping cases
Swimmers at the 1976 Summer Olympics
Swimmers at the 1980 Summer Olympics
1960 births
Living people
Olympic gold medalists for East Germany
Olympic silver medalists for East Germany
Olympic bronze medalists for East Germany
Female backstroke swimmers
Olympic swimmers of East Germany
World record setters in swimming
Olympic bronze medalists in swimming
East German female freestyle swimmers
World Aquatics Championships medalists in swimming
European Aquatics Championships medalists in swimming
Medalists at the 1980 Summer Olympics
Medalists at the 1976 Summer Olympics
Olympic silver medalists in swimming
Olympic gold medalists in swimming
People from Oschatz
Sportspeople from Saxony